Gregory Paul Dulcich (born March 26, 2000) is an American football tight end for the Denver Broncos of the National Football League (NFL). He played college football at UCLA and was twice an all-conference selection in the Pac-12, including first-team honors in 2021. He was selected in the third round of the 2022 NFL Draft.

Early years
Dulcich was born on March 26, 2000, and grew up in Glendale, California. He attended Saint Francis High School in La Cañada Flintridge. As a junior, he had 30 receptions for 406 yards and four touchdowns. In his senior year, the Golden Knights reached the 2017 CIF Southern Section Division III championship, losing 44–42 to Rancho Verde High School on a last-second field goal. During the season, Dulcich caught 50 passes for 1,168 yards and 12 touchdowns, and ran for another three touchdowns. He also made 21 tackles on defense.

Dulcich was ranked as a three-star recruit by ESPN and listed as the No. 78 recruit in California. He was initially recruited by Derek Sage, who was the receivers coach for Washington State. However, Sage moved to UCLA, as did Dulcich.

College career
A walk-on at the University of California, Los Angeles, Dulcich played three games as a freshman. He appeared in eleven games in 2019, playing on special teams and as a receiver.

In 2020, Dulcich was informed by UCLA on his 20th birthday that he was put on scholarship. He had a breakout year that season, which was shortened by the COVID-19 pandemic, finishing with 26 receptions for 517 yards and five touchdowns. He led the team in both receiving yards and touchdowns, while finishing second in catches to Kyle Philips (38). Dulcich's averages of 19.88 yards per catch and 73.9 receiving yards per game both ranked second in the country among tight ends. He was targeted 18 times on vertical pass routes, catching nine for 321 yards and four touchdowns. Ranked sixth in the Pac-12 in receiving yards per game, he was named second-team All-Pac-12.

In 2021, Dulcich was named to the preseason watch list for the Mackey Award, awarded to the best tight end in the nation. He had three catches for 117 yards, including a 75-yard touchdown, in a win over No. 16 LSU. He logged a career-high nine catches for 136 yards in a loss to Arizona State, his third career game with 100 yards or more. He earned first-team All-Pac-12 honors and finished fifth in the conference in receiving yards per game with 60.4. Dulcich averaged 17.3 yards per catch, which ranked second among tight ends in the nation, and his 725 receiving yards ranked second on the team to Philips (739). He declared for the NFL Draft after the season.

Professional career

Dulcich was selected by the Denver Broncos in the third round of the 2022 NFL Draft with the 80th overall pick. He was the third tight end chosen in the draft. Bothered by a hamstring injury during most of training camp, he was placed on injured reserve on August 31, 2022. Dulcich was activated for a Week 6 matchup against the Los Angeles Chargers on Monday Night Football, and caught a 39-yard touchdown from Russell Wilson in his NFL debut. He finished his rookie season with 33 catches for 411 yards and two touchdowns in ten games, of which he started six.

Personal life
Dulcich is of Croatian descent through all four of his grandparents.

References

External links

Denver Broncos bio
UCLA Bruins bio

2000 births
Living people
Sportspeople from Glendale, California
Players of American football from California
American football tight ends
American people of Croatian descent
UCLA Bruins football players
Denver Broncos players